Radio Paradise is a non-commercial listener-supported Internet radio station that helped to redefine the radio station for the internet era. It is known for high quality audio streams and curated playlists. The station is based in the United States but has a significant international audience, with many of the songs and station greetings on its "world" stream in multiple languages. The station is known familiarly as "RP".

Programming 
As of 2020, RP has four curated playlists: Rock Mix, emphasizing modern and classic rock; World/Etc Mix, emphasizing world and electronic music; Mellow Mix, emphasizing songs with a more relaxing tone; and Main Mix, combining the three. A little jazz and classical music is sometimes heard as well. Detailed information about the playlists is available on the website but they can only be listened to live on the stream. There is limited DJ commentary, with sets that can go on for hours without interruption.

Community 
The station has a lively online community via its song comments, forums, journals, comments section, and contests on the web site. Radio Paradise has more than 135,000 registered members and hundreds of thousands of listeners from all regions of the world.   the active play music library had over 16,000 songs and the total library size is over a million songs. The web site allows users to rate and comment on recently played songs. The players buffers the stream ahead, which allows users to skip individual tracks. The players provide detailed information on the artist being played, including data from the artist's Wikipedia page, the album cover, lyrics, distribution of user ratings, and a scrolling list of often colorful user comments, sometimes embellished with videos. As of June 2020, the track with highest listener rating of all time was "Wish You Were Here" by Pink Floyd. The ten most frequently played groups were Pink Floyd, The Beatles, Led Zeppelin, Radiohead, The Rolling Stones, David Bowie, U2, Peter Gabriel, R.E.M., and Dire Straits.

Streams 
RP streams are available in multiple compressed audio formats, as well as lossless FLAC. The streams can be accessed on virtually any device and operating system.

The web site and playout systems use Linux and customized open-source software components for most of its sections, a system devised by Goldsmith initially for KPIG's playout system. They also use PHP and BBCode.

History

The station was started in February 2000 by Bill Goldsmith and his wife Rebecca Goldsmith. It was originally operated from their home in Paradise, California, from which the station derives its name. The station had relocated to the Borrego Valley (east of San Diego, California) in 2016, before the town of Paradise was largely destroyed by the Camp Fire in November 2018.  In 2022, with Rebecca choosing to retire, and Bill's daughter, Alanna assuming Rebecca's roles, the station relocated to Eureka, California.

Bill has been a DJ at various stations (including KPIG, KFAT, KLRB, WCAS, and KPOI) since 1971, and has also been a radio station manager and a radio & TV engineer. In August 1995 Goldsmith inaugurated the world's first full-time webcast at KPIG using Xing Streamworks software.

Radio Paradise was featured in a TIME magazine article of April 11, 2004, called "The Revolution In Radio".

April 2006, RP introduced the Listeners World Map, showing the numbers and locations of listeners across the world, currently located under Help + Info/Member info.

In June 2006 Radio Paradise began trial runs of Octoshape for its 192 kbit/s MP3 stream. In September 2006, the station began a 128 kbit/s AAC stream. In 2012, RP began a 320 kbp/s AAC stream, and is now also offering lossless (FLAC) streaming.

Threat of the 2007 royalty rates increase
On March 6, 2007, the Copyright Royalty Board increased royalty rates, which would have raised the station's royalty fees tenfold. Bill Goldsmith spoke about this as a serious threat to the station and urged his listeners to sign an online petition to save the station. In subsequent negotiations, royalty rates were established that allowed Radio Paradise and other Internet radio stations to continue operations.

References

External links
 

Internet radio stations in the United States
Paradise, California